Carlowrightia is a genus of flowering plants in the bear's breeches family, Acanthaceae. Members of the genus, commonly known as wrightworts, are mainly small shrubs bearing inflorescences of lily-like flowers. They are native to the Americas, with many species found in western North America. The genus was named for the American botanist Charles Wright.

Selected species
 Carlowrightia arizonica A.Gray – Arizona wrightwort
 Carlowrightia cordifolia A.Gray
 Carlowrightia ecuadoriana T.F.Daniel & Wassh.
 Carlowrightia fuertensis 
 Carlowrightia henricksonii T.F.Daniel
 Carlowrightia linearifolia (Torr.) A.Gray – Heath wrightwort
 Carlowrightia mexicana Henrickson & Daniel – Mexican wrightwort
 Carlowrightia myriantha 
 Carlowrightia parviflora (Buckl.) Wassh. – Smallflower wrightwort
 Carlowrightia parvifolia Brandeg. – Littleleaf wrightwort
 Carlowrightia serpyllifolia A.Gray – Trans Pecos wrightwort
 Carlowrightia texana Henrickson & Daniel – Texas wrightwort
 Carlowrightia torreyana Wassh. – Torrey's wrightwort

References

External links

Jepson Manual Treatment: Carlowrightia

Acanthaceae
Acanthaceae genera
North American desert flora
Taxa named by Asa Gray
Taxonomy articles created by Polbot